Joyce Maureen Steele (December 25, 1935 – April 21, 2019) was a utility infielder/outfielder who played in the All-American Girls Professional Baseball League.

Steele was a member of the Kalamazoo Lassies club during its 1953 season, while playing briefly at first base and outfield. Unfortunately, there are no statistics available from her season because the league stopped recording individual achievements after 1948, so individual accomplishments are complete only through 1949.

Steele is part of the AAGPBL permanent display at the Baseball Hall of Fame and Museum in Cooperstown, New York, opened in 1988, which is dedicated to the entire league rather than any individual figure.

Sources

1935 births
2019 deaths
All-American Girls Professional Baseball League players
Baseball players from Pennsylvania
Kalamazoo Lassies players
People from Wyalusing, Pennsylvania
21st-century American women